The National Basketball League Most Outstanding Forward is an annual National Basketball League (NBL) award given since the league's inaugural season to the best performing player of the regular season who is classified as a small forward, power forward or centre. The majority of recipients are power forwards who can also play centre when required. Notable small forwards to have won the award include Clifton Bush (2001) and Thomas Abercrombie (2009 & 2010). The winner of the award receives the Commissioners Cup.

Winners

See also
 List of National Basketball League (New Zealand) awards

Notes

References

Awards established in 1982
for
F
1982 establishments in New Zealand